Fafi Constituency is an electoral constituency in Kenya. It is one of six constituencies in Garissa County. The constituency was established for the 1988 elections. The constituency has six wards, all electing councillors for the Garissa County Council.

Members of Parliament

Locations and wards

References

External links 
Map of the constituency

Constituencies in Garissa County
Constituencies in North Eastern Province (Kenya)
1988 establishments in Kenya
Constituencies established in 1988